Craig Milton Bragg (born March 15, 1982) is a former American football wide receiver. He attended UCLA and Bellarmine College Preparatory in San Jose, California.  Bragg graduated with the UCLA record for career receptions (since surpassed by Jordan Payton). He was drafted in the sixth round of the 2005 NFL Draft by the Green Bay Packers, only a few picks after fellow UCLA wideout Tab Perry was selected by the Cincinnati Bengals. Ran a sub 4.3 40 and has been unofficially clocked faster.  Bragg was also a member of the New York Jets and Chicago Bears.

College career
Bragg played wide receiver for UCLA from 2001–04, finishing as the school's career leader in receptions with 193 after breaking Kevin Jordan's previous mark of 179 set in 1995. He is also second on the list for career receiving yards and punt returns.

Professional career

Green Bay Packers
Bragg was selected by the Green Bay Packers in Round 6 of the 2005 NFL Draft.  Bragg competed for a spot as a reserve receiver and kick returner for the Packers, but failed to make the regular season roster.  He was signed to the Packers practice squad on September 5, 2005.  Bragg was released from the practice squad on November 1, 2005.

New York Jets
The New York Jets signed Craig Bragg to their practice squad on November 8, 2005.  Bragg was released from the Jets practice squad on November 25, 2005.

Chicago Bears
The Chicago Bears signed Craig Bragg to their practice squad on November 30, 2005.  He was signed to a future contract on February 11, 2006.

Bragg was released by the Bears on September 1, 2006.

Amsterdam Admirals
While a member of the Bears, Bragg was drafted by the Amsterdam Admirals of the NFL Europe on January 28, 2006.

References

External links
UCLA Bruins bio

1982 births
Living people
Players of American football from San Jose, California
American football wide receivers
University of California, Los Angeles alumni
UCLA Bruins football players
Amsterdam Admirals players